Metynodiol (INN), or methynodiol, also known as 11β-methyletynodiol, is a steroidal progestin of the 19-nortestosterone group that was synthesized in the 1960s but was never marketed. A diacetate ester, metynodiol diacetate (SC-19198), also exists.

See also
 Etynodiol
 Etynodiol diacetate

References

Estranes
Progestogens
Ethynyl compounds